Claude Lewis Terry (born January 12, 1950) is a former professional basketball player in the American Basketball Association (ABA) and the National Basketball Association (NBA). He played four seasons with the ABA (1972–1976) followed by two seasons in the NBA (1976–1978). Terry played college basketball for the Stanford Indians (now known as the Cardinal), where he was an All-Pac-8 first team selection in 1972. He was drafted in the 1972 NBA draft in the third round with the 42nd overall pick by the Phoenix Suns.

References

External links

1950 births
Living people
American men's basketball players
Atlanta Hawks players
Basketball players from California
Buffalo Braves players
College men's basketball head coaches in the United States
Denver Nuggets players
Denver Rockets players
Phoenix Suns draft picks
Seattle Pacific Falcons men's basketball coaches
Shooting guards
Small forwards
Stanford Cardinal men's basketball players
Stanislaus State Warriors men's basketball coaches
People from Salida, California